Dentalium tiwhana is a tusk shell of the family Dentaliidae, endemic to New Zealand waters.

References

Scaphopods
Molluscs described in 1953